Batrachedra mathesoni is a moth in the family Batrachedridae. It is found in Florida. The larvae have been recorded feeding on Cocos nucifera.

References

Natural History Museum Lepidoptera generic names catalog

Batrachedridae
Moths of North America
Moths described in 1916